Eriaxis is a monotypic genus of orchids (family Orchidaceae) belonging to the subfamily Vanilloideae. The sole species is Eriaxis rigida, endemic to New Caledonia. Its closest relative is Clematepistephium, also endemic to New Caledonia.

References

External links 

Vanilleae
Endemic flora of New Caledonia
Orchids of New Caledonia
Monotypic orchid genera
Vanilloideae genera